Political theology in China includes responses from Chinese government leaders, scholars, and religious leaders who deal with the relationship between religion and politics. For two millennia, this was organized based on a Confucian understanding of religion and politics, often discussed in terms of Confucian political philosophy. At various points throughout its history, Chinese Buddhism presented an alternative to the political import of Confucianism. However, since the mid-twentieth century, communist understandings of religion have dominated the discourse.

For Christianity, this relationship can be seen from the religion's earliest encounters in the country during the imperial period, with the Church of the East's interaction with the Emperor Taizong and Jesuit missionaries in the Ming court. But it has developed the most in the 20th and 21st centuries after the establishments of the Republic of China and People's Republic of China. This is particularly true through the establishment of the Protestant Three-Self Patriotic Movement and the Catholic Patriotic Association, the rise of underground and house churches, and interactions with the secular academy.

Imperial China 

For over two millennia, from the Han dynasty (206 BC – AD 220) until the Qing dynasty (1636–1912), the dominant ideology that was upheld as state orthodoxy was Confucianism. During much of this time, all other religions needed to be registered and administered under the Confucian political system. This would shape the history of the relationship between Christianity and politics in China could be traced to Tang Dynasty (618–907), when scholars believe that Christianity first came to China. Emperor Taizong and his successors of adopted the policy of religious tolerance. They allowed the mission of Church of the East monks and invited them to translate scriptures for the empire. In 845, during the Great Anti-Buddhist Persecution, the Church of the East was misunderstood as a sect of Buddhism and was banned by Emperor Wuzong. In Yuan Dynasty (1271–1368), several Mongol tribes converted to Christianity through the Church of the East. During this time, the Pope of the Roman Catholic Church also sent envoys to the Mongol Empire capital Khanbaliq (present-day Beijing).

In Ming Dynasty (1368–1644), Jesuits initiated mission in China. Matteo Ricci would be the most well-known among these missionaries. Jesuits exerted considerable influence at court via the policy of accommodation and converted several senior officials, such as Xu Guangqi. In Qing dynasty (1636–1912), Catholic missionaries still played important roles at court as consultants of emperors. In the 18th century, the Chinese Rites controversy had raised tension between the Vatican and Qing dynasty's Emperors. Emperor Yongzheng was formally against Christian converts among Manchu people and banned the mission again.

After the First Opium War (1839–1842), with the aid of several unequal treaties, Christian missionaries were allowed to evangelize in China and continue to import the Western civilization to China. Due to an impression that missionaries were allies with foreign colonial governments, many Chinese became hostile to Christianity. This further influenced the relationship between Christianity and politics. Many anti-missionary riots (Jiao'an), the Boxer Rebellion, and the anti-Christian movement can be considered as the consequences of such relationship.

Republic of China 

The 20th century witnessed the emergence of new Chinese political thinkers. The May Fourth movement emphasized a climate of strong political engagement, under the mantra of "Mr. Science" and "Mr. Democracy," and the growing ferment around the national salvation movement.

Kang Youwei advocated the idea of a Confucian church as the state religion of China. Taixu would seek to reform Chinese Buddhism, to contribute to the building of Chinese society and politics. Christian leaders like Y. T. Wu, in the face of the anti-Christian movement, appealed to revolutionary theory and constructed a Chinese Christian theology.

People's Republic of China

Protestantism 
After 1949, the founding of the People's Republic of China, the Chinese Protestant leaders encountered new challenges – the new regime of the communist government is based on atheistic ideology of Marxism. They had to decide how to deal with the relationship with the atheistic government. There were different attitudes and theologies among Chinese Christians. Some of them, such as Y. T. Wu, who were willing to support the new government, helped to pen the Christian Manifesto and initiated the Three-Self movement (TSPM) in 1950s; they reconstructed theology in terms of cooperation. Others, such as Wang Mingdao, were unwilling to endorse the radical TSPM and refused to support the new government, are regarded as the forerunners of the present-day house church.

In the 1950s Denunciation Campaigns, some Christian leaders, such as Wang Mingdao, Watchman Nee, from the opposing camp were arrested and sentenced in the name of counter-revolutionaries. During the ten years of Cultural Revolution (1966–1976), all the religious activities were banned and many Christians met and worshiped in the Christians' houses.

In 1980s, religious activities recovered and churches gradually opened. However, Christians unwilling to join the TSPM churches chose to gather in unregistered house churches, commemorating in personal houses or apartments. K. H. Ting and Wang Weifan were leaders and representatives of the TSPM church. Wang Mingdao and Wang Yi would be representatives of the house church; the latter Wang is the pastor in the urban church in Chengdu which is not a traditional house church yet still claims the link to the house church.

Catholicism 
In the 1950s, after Zhou Enlai saw the possibilities in Protestantism with the TSPM, a similar approach was taken with Catholicism leading to the formation in 1957 of the Catholic Patriotic Association (CPA), severing ties with the Vatican. Those who chose not to affiliate with the CPA and remain loyal to the Pope and the Vatican are often considered part of the underground church.

Ignatius Kung Pin-Mei, the Catholic bishop of Shanghai, opposed the formation of the CPA and, along with several hundred bishops and church leaders, was arrested on 8 September 1955. He viewed the CPA as being schismatic and, therefore, not in union with the universal Roman Catholic Church. Kung criticized China's lack of religious freedom and reckoned that Chinese Catholics "do not have the freedom to worship." When he was interviewed by the Soul Magazine in 1993, Kung expressed his sympathy for the underground Catholics and Bishops under the Communist government and claimed that, "The government should understand from history that every time the Church was persecuted, the Church has always survived and grown out of the persecution."

Another significant figure was Aloysius Jin Luxian, who was arrested alongside Kung on 8 September 1955. However, after being released from prison in 1982, he took several leadership roles within the CPA, including becoming founding rector of the Sheshan Seminary and bishop of Shanghai in 1988, without Vatican approval.

Confucianism 

Despite the Anti-Confucius developments of the Cultural Revolution, since the 1980s, there has been a restored interest in Confucianism as offering a renewed political ideology for mainland China. Part of this has included the introduction of New Confucianism from Taiwan and North America. Some have advocated for the building of new Confucian churches in the country. Others, such as Jiang Qing have advocated for a new form of constitutional Confucianism.

Academy 
Since the late 1980s there has been a growing interest in Christianity among academics in China's secular universities. Often described as Cultural Christians, many of whom are not self-identified Christians, these scholars have been drawn to Christianity as a source for the modernization of China. One of the key figures of this movement, Liu Xiaofeng at Renmin University of China, in the 2000s began to draw on the political theology of Carl Schmitt for engaging the Chinese political arena. Others, such as Xie Zhibin from Tongji University in Shanghai, has attempted to offer a public theological engagement based on the theology of Max Stackhouse. Most recently, Zhuo Xinping of the Chinese Academy of Social Sciences has advocated for the sinicization or Chinization of Christianity both politically and culturally.

Key documents

The Christian Manifesto 
"The Christian Manifesto" was published in July 1950 and its original title was "Direction of Endeavor for Chinese Christianity in the Construction of New China." The founding group of the Three-Self Patriotic Movement, including Y. T. Wu, drafted the document in consultation with Premier Zhou Enlai. During the 1950s, 400,000 Protestant Christians publicly endorsed and signed this document.

The 95 Theses of the Chinese Reformed Church 
In August 2015 Wang Yi posted a document titled "Reaffirming Our Stance on the House Churches: 95 Theses" in an attempt to reaffirm the Chinese house church's position in the relationship between government and society. Echoing Martin Luther's 95 theses, these Chinese 95 theses demonstrate his opinion of the church-state relationship from the perspective of the house church.

References

Footnotes

Bibliography 

 
 
 
 
 
 
 
 
 
 
 
 
 
 

Christian theology and politics
Christianity in China
World Christianity
China